"Greatest" is a song by American rapper Eminem from his album Kamikaze (2018).<ref>{{Cite web |url=https://www.cbsnews.com/news/kamikaze-new-eminem-album-surprise-venom-movie-single/ |title=Eminem Drops Surprise Album "Kamikaze |last=Park |first=Andrea |date=September 1, 2018 |publisher=CBS News}}</ref> The second track of the album, the song, was produced by Jeremy "Backpack" Miller and Mike Will Made It. It contains interpolations of "Humble" by Kendrick Lamar and "wokeuplikethis*" by Playboi Carti featuring Lil Uzi Vert.

Composition
The song, produced by Mike Will Made It and Jeremy "Backpack" Miller, contains interpolations of Kendrick Lamar's "Humble" and Playboi Carti's "Woke Up Like This". This is one of multiple songs in which he addresses the criticism of his last project, Revival''.

Personnel
Eminem – lead vocals
Jeremy "Backpack" Miller – production
Mike Will Made It – production
Tony Campagna – recording
Joe Strange – recording
Mike Strange – recording

Charts

Certifications

References

2018 songs
Songs written by Eminem
Eminem songs
Songs written by Playboi Carti
Songs written by Kendrick Lamar
Songs written by Lil Uzi Vert
Songs written by Mike Will Made It
Songs written by Pi'erre Bourne
Song recordings produced by Mike Will Made It